Harrison Joshua Perritt (born 16 February 2001) is an English professional footballer who plays as a defender for National League side Altrincham.

Career
Born in Knowsley, Perritt started his youth career at Preston North End before switching to Accrington Stanley in 2011 at the age of 11. In July 2019, he signed a one-year professional contract with the club with the option of a further year. His contract was extended at the end of the season. Perritt made his debut for the club on 12 January 2021 in a 4–0 EFL Trophy defeat away to Lincoln City. On 4 February 2021, he joined Southport on a month-long loan. On 20 March 2021, he made his league debut for Accrington as a substitute in a 3–1 League One win over Wigan Athletic.

In October 2021, Perritt joined National League club Torquay United on loan until January 2022. He made 8 appearances on loan at Torquay. On 19 February 2022, Perritt joined National League side Altrincham on loan for the remainder of the 2021–22 season. He scored once in his 12 matches at Altrincham.

In March 2022, Perritt joined National League side Altrincham.

References

External links

Living people
2000 births
English footballers
Sportspeople from Knowsley, Merseyside
Footballers from Merseyside
Association football defenders
Accrington Stanley F.C. players
Southport F.C. players
Torquay United F.C. players
Altrincham F.C. players
English Football League players
National League (English football) players